Sanchez Peak is a  peak on the ridge that extends eastward to Mount Osborne in southern Sentinel Range of the Ellsworth Mountains, Antarctica. It was named by the Advisory Committee on Antarctic Names (US-ACAN) in 2006 after Richard D. Sanchez of U.S. Geological Survey, a senior physical scientist and specialist in remote sensing, image analysis and the use of GPS and GIS with respect to Antarctic mapping applications.

Location
US mapping in 1961, updated in 1988.

Maps
 Vinson Massif.  Scale 1:250 000 topographic map.  Reston, Virginia: US Geological Survey, 1988.
 Antarctic Digital Database (ADD). Scale 1:250000 topographic map of Antarctica. Scientific Committee on Antarctic Research (SCAR). Since 1993, regularly upgraded and updated.

References
 Sanchez Peak. SCAR Composite Gazetteer of Antarctica.

Ellsworth Mountains
Mountains of Ellsworth Land